Campbell–Hicks House is a historic home located at Huntington, Cabell County, West Virginia. It was built in 1896, and is a -story, masonry dwelling in the Queen Anne style.  It features a slender, two story cantilevered rounded tower.  It also has a full front porch with a roof upheld by five sets of paired fluted columns with Ionic order capitals.

It was listed on the National Register of Historic Places in 1985.

References

Houses on the National Register of Historic Places in West Virginia
Queen Anne architecture in West Virginia
Houses completed in 1896
Houses in Huntington, West Virginia
National Register of Historic Places in Cabell County, West Virginia